The Archdiocese of Cranganore or Cranganor and Angamaly was a latinised  Syriac Padroado Archdiocese in Kodungallur,  Kerala, India. This diocese is a product of so-called Synod of Diamper held in East Syriac Archdiocese of Angamaly and All India. Its headquarters was first at St. Thomas  church, Cranganore Fort until 1662 and then at Puthenchira  church for more than a century. Mar Paremmakkal Thoma Kathanar, Administrator of the diocese moved its headquarters to Vadayar due to invasion of Tipu Sultan. Mar Poulose Pandari, a Chaldean Bishop belongs to Puthenchira parish of this diocese.

History

East Syriac Archdiocese of All India

Archdiocese of Angamaly

Bishops and hierarchs after the Synod of Diamper

Diocese of Angamalé
Taken into Roman Catholicism and degraded into a diocese by Roman Catholic Padroado Colonial power and Jesuit missionaries: 20 Dec 1599 through the Synod of Diamper

Syriac language name:AngamaliLatin Name: Angamalensis

Malayalam Name: Angamaly

Archdiocese of Cranganore
Name Changed: 1600
Malayalam name: Kodungalloor
Latin Name: Cranganorensis

Francis Ros  S.J. (Francisco Rodríguez) (15 Dec 1599  - 18 Feb 1624 Died)
Etienne de Brito, S.J. (18 Feb 1624  - 2 Dec 1641 Died)
Francisco Garcia Mendes, S.J. (2 Dec 1641  - 3 Sep 1659 Died)
Mar Alexander Parambil - Auxiliary Bishop of Cranganore (Angamala) and Vicar Apostolic of Malabar (1 Feb 1663 - 16 July 1685)
Jerome de São Tiago, O.S.B. (8 Jan 1689 - ? Resigned before consecration)
Didacus Álvares (19 Apr 1694 - 30 Dec 1697 Resigned)
João Ribeiro (archbishop), S.J. (5 Dec 1701 - 24 Jan 1716 Died)
Antonio Pimentel (archbishop), S.J. (20 Jan 1721 - 6 Mar 1752 Died)
João Luis Vasconcellos, S.J. (6 Mar 1752 - 11 Oct 1754 Died)
Salvator dos Reis, S.J. (19 Jul 1756 - 7 Apr 1777 Died)
Kariattil Mar Iousep (16 Dec 1782 - 9 Sep 1786 Died)
Paremmakkal Thomas (Administrator) (1786 - 1799)
Teodoro Botelho Homen Bernardes (26 Aug 1806 Confirmed - )
Paulo a Santo Tomas de Aquino, O.P. (17 Dec 1819 - 19 Dec 1823 Died)
José Joaquim de Oliveira Carvalho (da Imaculada Conceição Amarante), O.F.M. Obs. (19 Dec 1825- 1835 Died)
1838: Suppressed to the Vicariate Apostolic of Verapoly

References

Former Roman Catholic dioceses in India